Terri Moss (born January 25, 1966 in Denver, Colorado) is a retired female boxer, and a 2015 inductee into the International Women's Boxing Hall of Fame.

Background
Her family moved to Athens, Georgia in 1975 where she grew up and resided until 2003 when she moved to Atlanta to work with professional boxing trainer, Xavier Biggs. Xavier is the brother of 1984 Olympic Super Heavyweight Gold Medalist Tyrell Biggs.  Prior to boxing, Moss pursued a career in Law Enforcement working at several different levels in that field.  She spent the majority of her career as a Narcotics Investigator.

Boxing career
Moss began her experience in boxing at the age of 34 under Chicago native "Doc" Keppner and worked with him for two years.  Keppner was reluctant to train Moss due to her age and physical limitations (Hepatitis C) that would keep her out of the ring, However; he did use her as his assistant working corners of his professional fighters and taught her to be a cut man. Prior to beginning her own boxing career she had worked over twenty professional fights as chief second and cutman.  She was one of the first females documented to have been cut man and chief second for a male fighter.

During her time with Keppner, Moss sought medical attention and underwent Interferon Therapy. Once cured of Hepatitis C, she resumed training to box competitively, entering the professional ranks at 36 years old.

Moss began her pro career in a fight offered by Keppner against newly crowned WIBA Intercontinental Champion Wendy Sprowl of Boston, Massachusetts, losing a unanimous four round decision.  Her second came against future IFBA & WIBA World Champion Maribel Zurita, and the third against #1 ranked Patricia Martinez, each to whom she dropped decisions.   At 0-3 Moss began training with Xavier Biggs, and soon after fought was Atlanta's highly touted and #1 world ranked minimumweight Nina Ahlin.  Prior to the fight against Moss, Ahlin was also trained by Xavier Biggs.  Moss landed her first win against Ahlin, one of the biggest moments in her career also rated one of the biggest upsets in women's professional boxing that year, and was shortly after ranked #2 in the world.  She held that ranking for over two years and remained a top-ten rated fighter for the rest of her career.

During her career Moss fought for five world titles in three weight divisions.  On May 10, 2007 she won the WIBF Strawweight World Title, and the WIBA mini flyweight Intercontinental Title in Tulsa, Oklahoma, against Stephanie Dobbs.  Moss was 41 years old, and Dobbs only 28, two years older than Moss' own daughter.  After two failed attempts to arrange a title defense, Moss retired without a defense one year later on May 10, 2008.  She retired in Atlanta, Georgia as a full-time boxing trainer and personal trainer for women in an all-female boxing program at Decatur Boxing Club in Decatur, GA. Moss trains competing amateur and professional boxers, conducts boxing fitness programs, and is a personal trainer and author.

After retirement

Once retired Moss founded "Atlanta Corporate Fight Night", a high-end white collar charity boxing show, and began promoting in October 2010.  By the end of 2012 she had promoted five successful shows and partnered with Tomorrow Pictures in moving Corporate Fight Night nationally while building material for a documentary on women's boxing. Over the two year - five show time span her Corporate Fight Night had been discussed on several radio and internet radio shows, magazines, newspapers, television, and news media outlets both in the US and internationally.   Some of the coverage included CNN, ESPN, NBC, Yahoo Sports, The Atlanta Journal-Constitution, Atlanta Magazine, Best Self Magazine, Stiletto Woman Magazine, Ebony Magazine, Sports Destination Management, and Bloomberg Businessweek.

In 2011 Moss began working with several professional boxing sanctioning bodies and began supervising world championship fights.  She serves as the chairman of women's boxing for the Champions of Dignity Association (CODA) which financially supports the Retired Boxer's Foundation (RBF)and in 2012 she was designated as a coordinator for the Women's International Boxing Federation (WIBF) and the Global Boxing Union (GBU) where she assists in sanctioning and supervising for men's (GBU) and women's (WIBF & GBU) world championship fights.

Hall of Fame

Terri Moss was among the second class of inductees into the International Women's Boxing Hall of Fame in Fort Lauderdale, Florida on July 11, 2015.

She was inducted alongside Laila Ali, Jeannine Garside, Deirdre Gogarty, Phyllis Kugler, Sparkle Lee, Laura Serrano and Ann Wolfe.

Professional boxing record

References

External links
 Official Site
 Women's Boxing Archive Network
 
 Hall of Fame Press Release
 International Women's Boxing Hall of Fame

Boxers from Denver
American women boxers
Living people
Boxers from Atlanta
1966 births
World boxing champions
American female karateka
21st-century American women